Sanya Dharmasakti (5 April 1907 – 6 January 2002) was a Thai jurist, university professor and politician. He served as the 12th Prime Minister of Thailand from 1973 to 1975.

Sanya Dharmasakti was one of the most influential figures in the politics of Thailand. He served as the president of the Supreme Court (1968–1973) and was dean of the faculty of law and chancellor of Thammasat University during the democracy movement of October 1973. When the "three tyrants" fled, leaving the country leaderless, Sanya was appointed prime minister by royal command (establishing a precedent exercised only three times since for appointment of prime ministers.) Sanya served a second consecutive term by a House resolution for a combined total of 1 year, 124 days, during which he ordered the withdrawal of US forces in what was called Operation Palace Lightning. Sanya appointed a drafting committee for the 1974 constitution, served as vice-president of the constitutional congress, and was requested by the monarch to serve as the president of the privy council.

Family background
Dharmasakti was born on Friday, 5 April 1907 in Thonburi Province, in central Thailand. His father was the high ranking Buddhist scholar, Mahamtree, and abbot, Dhammasarnvetvisetpakdee Srisattayawatta Phiriyapaha or Thongdee Dharmasakti. His mother was Shuen Dharmmasarnvet. Sanya married Pa-nga Dharmasakti, also known as Phenchart, who died in 2001. They had two sons, named Chartsak and Jakatham.

Education
Dharmasakti went to Assumption College in 1914 and finished high school, majoring in English in 1925. He went to the law school of the Ministry of Justice for three years, graduating in 1928. He got the highest score and received the Rapheeboonnithi scholarship. This scholarship allowed him to study law in England at the Middle Temple for three years. He was called to the English Bar in 1932.

Palace Lightning
Palace Lightning was the name given the plan by which the USAF withdrew its aircraft and personnel from Thailand. After the fall of the US-supported governments in both Phnom Penh and Saigon in the spring of 1975, the political climate between Washington and the government of Judge Sanya soured, and US military forces were ordered to withdraw by the end of the year. Strategic Air Command units left in December 1975; U-Tapao Royal Thai Navy Airfield, however, remained under US control until formally handed back to the Thai government on 13 June 1976.

Death
Sanya Dharmasakti died at Ramathibodi Hospital, Bangkok on 6 January 2002.

Royal decorations
Sanya received the following royal decorations in the Honours System of Thailand:
 1940 –  Commander (Third Class) of The Most Noble Order of the Crown of Thailand
 1941 –  Commander (Third Class) of the Most Exalted Order of the White Elephant
 1948 –  Knight Commander (Second Class) of The Most Noble Order of the Crown of Thailand
 1950 –  Chakrabarti Mala Medal
 1954 –  King Rama IX Royal Cypher Medal, 3rd Class
 1954 –  Knight Grand Cross (First Class) of the Most Noble Order of the Crown of Thailand
 1956 –  Knight Grand Cross (First Class) of the Most Exalted Order of the White Elephant
 1957 –  Knight Commander (Second Class, lower grade) of The Most Illustrious Order of Chula Chom Klao
 1959 –  Knight Grand Cordon (Special Class) of The Most Noble Order of the Crown of Thailand
 1961 –  Knight Grand Cordon (Special Class) of the Most Exalted Order of the White Elephant
 1962 –  Knight Grand Commander (Second Class, higher grade) of the Most Illustrious Order of Chula Chom Klao
 1968 –  Knight Grand Cross (First Class) of The Most Illustrious Order of Chula Chom Klao
 1969 –  Dushdi Mala - Civilian
 1971 –  King Rama IX Royal Cypher Medal, 1st Class
 1996 –  Knight of The Ancient and Auspicious Order of the Nine Gems

Foreign Honours
: Grand Cordon of the Order of the Rising Sun
: Grand Cross 1st Class of the Order of Merit of the Federal Republic of Germany
: Grand Cross of the Order of the Million Elephants and the White Parasol
: Grand Collar of the Order of Sikatuna
: Grand Cross of the Order of the Sun of Peru

Academic rank
 Professor of Thammasat University

References

Sanya Dharmasakti
Sanya Dharmasakti
Sanya Dharmasakti
Sanya Dharmasakti
Sanya Dharmasakti
Sanya Dharmasakti
Sanya Dharmasakti
Sanya Dharmasakti
Sanya Dharmasakti
Grand Crosses 1st class of the Order of Merit of the Federal Republic of Germany
Members of the Middle Temple
1907 births
2002 deaths